The Moundsville Daily Echo is a daily newspaper serving Moundsville, West Virginia, and surrounding Marshall County. Published Monday through Friday, excluding holidays, it has a circulation of 2,750 and is owned by Moundsville Echo, LLC. It is the only daily newspaper in Marshall County, and is published by Charles Walton.

History 
The Echo was founded in 1891 by J. D. Shaw as the Moundsville Echo, a weekly. In 1896, it went to daily publication. Shaw billed it as an independent paper, featuring the slogan "The news unbiased and unbossed" on the masthead.

On J.D. Shaw's death in 1917, the publication passed to his son, Samuel Craig Shaw. Shaw's politics were largely Democratic, and in those years he was a proponent of barring black voters to ensure a Democratic victory.

The paper was passed down in turn to Samuel Cockayne Shaw in 1951. In 1984, the Echo was up to a circulation of 5,000, published in a nine-column format and adhering to its publisher's penchant for Simplified Spelling. Sam C. Shaw, who was nicknamed the Flying Turtle because of his slow running, was a beloved tinkerer who was known for collecting news via his bike route. He designed and installed several electronic systems in the town, including the fire alarm system, which did not work during its unveiling ceremony. Shaw rigged the system using a toaster and the system worked, and continued to work for several years using the toaster. Sam C. Shaw operated the paper until his death in 1995.

After Shaw's death, the paper was published and edited by Charles "Charlie" Walton from 1995 until 2014; he died in 2019 at the age of 87.

Related Resources
 List of newspapers in West Virginia

References

Newspapers published in West Virginia